Sultan Abdul Halim Highway, Federal Route 1, is a broad and busy road link to Alor Star, Kedah, Malaysia via the North South Expressway (NSE) from Kuala Lumpur and Penang. It was named after Sultan Abdul Halim of Kedah.

List of interchanges

See also
 Federal Route 1

Highways in Malaysia